Ofisa Treviranus (born 31 March 1984) is a Samoan rugby union player. Treviranus played for Samoa's national sevens team and was part of the 12 men squad who won the IRB Sevens World Series in 2010.

Treviranus made his debut for the fifteen men code against Japan in Sigatoka on 18 June 2009. He was part of the 2011 Rugby World Cup squad for Samoa, and played in three matches. As of 2015, he is the captain of the Samoan national team.

After the World Cup, Treviranus was signed by English club London Irish. He previously played for Irish club Connacht Rugby.

References

External links
ESPN Scrum Profile
Player Profile
Profile
2011 Rugby World Cup Profile
London Irish Profile

1984 births
London Irish players
Connacht Rugby players
Samoa international rugby union players
Pacific Islanders rugby union players
Samoan rugby union players
Living people
Samoan expatriate rugby union players
Expatriate rugby union players in Ireland
Expatriate rugby union players in England
Samoan expatriate sportspeople in Ireland
Samoan expatriate sportspeople in England
Samoa international rugby sevens players
Rugby union flankers